The Drummine Farm is a historic home and farm complex located at New Market, Frederick County, Maryland, United States. The main house was constructed about 1790 and is a -story structure of uncoursed fieldstone. The house retains Georgian stylistic influences in exterior and interior decorative detailing. The farm complex structures include a stone tenant house dated 1816, and four additional fieldstone buildings from the early 19th century: a smokehouse, a water storage house, a garden outhouse, and a large bank barn. Wooden farm buildings include a calf shed and a wagon shed with corn cribs from the late 19th century, a dairy barn with three cement stave silos from the 1930s, several sheds and garages, and a large pole barn.

The Drummine Farm was listed on the National Register of Historic Places in 1987.

References

External links
, including photo in 1985, at Maryland Historical Trust

Houses completed in 1790
Georgian architecture in Maryland
Houses in Frederick County, Maryland
Houses on the National Register of Historic Places in Maryland
National Register of Historic Places in Frederick County, Maryland